John Cecil Clavering OBE (17 April 1910 – 6 October 2001) was an English architect, best known for his work designing Odeon Cinemas as part of Harry Weedon's architectural practice in the 1930s, and his later work as the architect of the Public Record Office in Kew, London.

Life
Clavering was born and educated in Sunderland, the son of a schoolmaster. At the age of seventeen he was articled to a firm of architects in South Shields while studying architecture at Armstrong College, Newcastle, where he was introduced to the work of Le Corbusier, Willem Marinus Dudok, Erich Mendelsohn and Berthold Lubetkin. With a travelling scholarship he visited the major architecture centres of Italy, Austria and Germany in 1929 and 1930.

Clavering's work at the time included the draughtsmanship or design of several cinemas in South Shields and Newcastle upon Tyne.
Clavering was unhappy with the classical detailing that was required for the cinemas, however - feeling that such ostentatious decoration was inappropriate in poor areas and also presented practical problems when reproduced in terracotta or faience - and concluded that "the answer appeared to be the new architecture advocated by Le Corbusier and the Germans".

Clavering's opportunity came when Harry Weedon was commissioned to redesign the interior of a cinema being built in Warley for Oscar Deutsch, owner of the expanding Odeon Cinemas chain. Weedon's practice at the time numbered only six architects, none of whom except Weedon himself had any experience of cinema design, so Clavering was recruited to complete the job. He next worked on the Odeon, Kingstanding, then examples in Sutton Coldfield, Colwyn Bay and Scarborough, "one masterpiece after the other" considered "the finest expressions of the Odeon circuit style". Later in 1935 however Clavering stunned Weedon by resigning to take up a job with the Office of Works. Weedon approached Clavering's former tutor who recommended Robert Bullivant as Clavering's replacement.

In 1935 Clavering entered the only design  competition ever held for direct entry into the professional class of H.M.Office of Works and was offered a post in Shanghai. He was to provide all buildings and accommodation needs of the Diplomatic and Consular Service of the Far East from Siam to Japan.

In 1934 Clavering had married Maysie Hanlon whom he had met whilst studying at Durham University. She was the daughter of a grocer who owned several shops on Tyneside. They travelled to Shanghai together and their daughter, Ann, was born there in August 1935. They lived in a house provided for them in the grounds of the British Consulate. 

In 1941 the family returned to England by sea via Canada and America. They lived near London during this wartime period and Clavering remained with the Office of Works. He then specialised in buildings and facilities for research throughout England.  These included the Blue Streak Project at Spadeadam in Cumbria; the wind tunnels for the Royal Aircraft Establishment at Farnborough and Bedford, and the radio communication centre at Goonhilly Downs in Cornwall.

He was later involved in the design of the buildings housing the Nuclear Reactors at Windscale in Cumbria, now called Sellafield, and Britain’s first working Nuclear Power Station. Another project, the rebuilding of Whitehall in London, was later aborted. His final project, the Public Record Office at Kew, he regarded as his best work. 

Clavering was awarded the OBE for Services to Architecture in 1971 and he and Maysie then retired to Harrogate for their final years.

References

20th-century English architects
1910 births
2001 deaths
People from Sunderland
Architects from London
Alumni of Newcastle University
Alumni of Armstrong College, Durham